The 2009 Utah State Aggies football team represented Utah State University as a member of the Western Athletic Conference (WAC) in the 2009 NCAA Division I FBS football season. The Aggies were led by first-year head coach Gary Andersen and played their home games at Romney Stadium. Utah State finished the season with a record of 4–8 overall and 3–5 in WAC play.

Schedule

References

Utah State
Utah State Aggies football seasons
Utah State Aggies football